United Nations Security Council resolution 2114, adopted on 30 July 2013, after recalling all relevant resolutions on Cyprus, the Council discussed expanding the UN peacekeeping mission in Cyprus as part of a wider process to settle the Cyprus dispute.

Resolution 2114 was adopted by 13 votes to none, with 2 abstentions from Azerbaijan and Pakistan.

See also
 Cyprus dispute
 List of United Nations Security Council Resolutions 2101 to 2200 (2013–2015)
 United Nations Buffer Zone in Cyprus
 Turkish Invasion of Cyprus

References

External links
Text of the Resolution at undocs.org
Votes on the resolution

 2114
 2114
July 2013 events